Chemokine (C-X-C motif) ligand 15 (CXCL15) is a small cytokine belonging to the CXC chemokine family that has been described in the mouse.  This chemokine is also known under the name lungkine. CXCL15 is an ELR+ CXC chemokine (it contains the amino acid sequence E-L-R immediately before its CXC motif) that recruits neutrophils during inflammation of the lungs.  It is highly abundant in epithelial cells of the lung, and can also be found in other mucosal organs such as the urogenital and gastrointestinal tracts, and in endocrine organs like the adrenal gland. The gene for CXCL15 is found on mouse chromosome 5.

References

Cytokines